Mujlad is a city in West Kurdufan State in the west of Sudan. It is the center town of the Misseriya tribe, sometimes also transliterated as "Messeria" tribe.

In the late seventies, early eighties, Muglad was used as a staging area for oilfield operations, mainly by California-based Chevron, due to its location within the Muglad Basin. At the Muglad airport , air operations were conducted in DC-3, Convair and also leased Hercules from Transamerica to link the PP West with the capital Khartoum, for personnel transportation and materials, goods, supplies and fuel.  Twin-otter DHC-6s were used for single-pilot flights to the drilling-rig wellsites at jungle / desert sites, and the STOL characteristics were put the test at every mission. In these pre-GPS days, navigation was aided by the Omega-VLF system receivers mounted on the DHC-6.

Transport 

It is served by a railway station on the Waw branch of Sudan Railways.

It is the junction for a branch line to the oil fields at Abu Jabra.

In late 70's and early 80's, the Muglad airfield was very active owing to the Chevron Aviation department operations to support oil exploration logistics. The type of aircraft included Twin Otter DHC6, DC3, Convair and Hercules.

See also 
 Railway stations in Sudan

References 

Populated places in West Kurdufan